The grammar of Standard Chinese or Mandarin shares many features with other varieties of Chinese.  The language almost entirely lacks inflection; words typically have only one grammatical form. Categories such as number (singular or plural) and verb tense are frequently not expressed by any grammatical means, but there are several particles that serve to express verbal aspect and, to some extent, mood.

The basic word order is subject–verb–object (SVO), as in English. Otherwise, Chinese is chiefly a head-final language, meaning that modifiers precede the words that they modify. In a noun phrase, for example, the head noun comes last, and all modifiers, including relative clauses, come in front of it. This phenomenon however is more typically found in subject–object–verb languages, such as Turkish and Japanese.

Chinese frequently uses serial verb constructions, which involve two or more verbs or verb phrases in sequence. Chinese prepositions behave similarly to serialized verbs in some respects, and they are often referred to as coverbs. There are also location markers, which are placed after a noun and are thus often called postpositions; they are often used in combination with a coverb. Predicate adjectives are normally used without a copular verb ("to be") and so can be regarded as a type of verb.

As in many other East Asian languages, classifiers or measure words are required when numerals and sometimes other words, such as demonstratives, are used with nouns. There are many different classifiers in the language, and each countable noun generally has a particular classifier associated with it. Informally, however, it is often acceptable to use the general classifier ge in place of other specific classifiers.

Word formation
In Chinese, the concept of words and the boundaries between them is not always transparent, and the Chinese script does not use spaces between words. Grammatically, some strings of characters behave as single words in some contexts, but are separable in others. Sometimes the behavior of such compounds is anomalous, however; for instance  ("to be concerned about") behaves as an inseparable word when the perfective particle le is attached, although it is separable in the phrase  (literally "concern what about", meaning "to be concerned about what").

Chinese morphemes, or minimum units of meaning, are mostly monosyllabic. Syllables, and thus in most cases morphemes, are represented as a rule by single characters. Some words consist of single syllables, but many words are formed by compounding two or more monosyllabic morphemes. These may be either free or bound – that is, they may or may not also be able to stand independently. Most two-syllable compound nouns have the head on the right, while in compound verbs the head is usually on the left.

Many disyllabic nouns are produced by adding the suffix  (originally meaning "child") to a monosyllabic word or morpheme. There is a strong tendency for monosyllables to be avoided in certain positions; for example, a disyllabic verb will not normally be followed by a monosyllabic object. This may be connected with the preferred metrical structure of the language.

Reduplication
A common feature in Chinese is reduplication, where a syllable or word is repeated to produce a modified meaning. This can happen with:
classifiers, to produce a phrase meaning "all"; for example,  ("all the mountains"), where ordinarily  is the classifier used in a phrase denoting a specific number of mountains
syllables in some informal words denoting family relations, for example  ("mother"),  ("younger brother")
many verbs, to mark the delimitative aspect ("to do something for a little bit") or for general emphasis – see the  section
other adjectives have ABB reduplication structure. (xiāngpēnpēn "delicious"). (liàngjīngjīng "shining").

Prefixes 

 — "-able" 
  — "reliable"
   — "respectable"
  — "anti-"
   [] — "anti-terror"
   [] — "anti-clerical"
   [] — "anti-fascist"

Suffixes 

 — "change"
  [] — "internationalise"
   [] — "worsen"
  — "attribute"
   — "safety"
   — "effectiveness"

Infixes 
 — "can" and  — "cannot"
  — "can understand"
  — "cannot understand"

Sentence structure

Chinese, like English, is classified as an SVO (subject–verb–object) language. Transitive verbs precede their objects in typical simple clauses, while the subject precedes the verb. For example:

Chinese can also be considered a topic-prominent language: there is a strong preference for sentences that begin with the topic, usually "given" or "old" information; and end with the comment, or "new" information. Certain modifications of the basic subject–verb–object order are permissible and may serve to achieve topic-prominence. In particular, a direct or indirect object may be moved to the start of the clause to create topicalization. It is also possible for an object to be moved to a position in front of the verb for emphasis.

Another type of sentence is what has been called an ergative structure, where the apparent subject of the verb can move to object position; the empty subject position is then often occupied by an expression of location. Compare locative inversion in English. This structure is typical of the verb  ("there is/are"; in other contexts the same verb means "have"), but it can also be used with many other verbs, generally denoting position, appearance or disappearance. An example:

Chinese is also to some degree a pro-drop or null-subject language, meaning that the subject can be omitted from a clause if it can be inferred from the context. In the following example, the subject of the verbs for "hike" and "camp" is left to be inferred—it may be "we", "I", "you", "she", etc.

In the next example the subject is omitted and the object is topicalized by being moved into subject position, to form a passive-type sentence.

Adverbs and adverbial phrases that modify the verb typically come after the subject but before the verb, although other positions are sometimes possible; see Adverbs and adverbials. For constructions that involve more than one verb or verb phrase in sequence, see Serial verb constructions. For sentences consisting of more than one clause, see Conjunctions.

Objects
Some verbs can take both an indirect object and a direct object. Indirect normally precedes direct, as in English:

With many verbs, however, the indirect object may alternatively be preceded by prepositional gěi; in that case it may either precede or follow the direct object. (Compare the similar use of to or for in English.)

In certain situations a direct object may be preceded by the accusative marker bǎ. This generally denotes an action that results in a change of state in the object. For further details of this, see the bǎ construction section. Such a bǎ phrase no longer occupies the normal direct object position, but moves in front of the verb. Compare:

The meanings of the above two sentences are similar, but the one with bǎ may be considered to place more emphasis on what happened to the object. It may also indicate definiteness—"the plate" rather than "a plate". Certain other markers can be used in a similar way to bǎ, such as the formal jiāng and colloquial ná.

Some verbs can apparently take two direct objects, which may be called an "inner" and an "outer" object. These cannot both follow the verb – typically the outer object will be placed at the start of the sentence (topicalized) or introduced via the bǎ construction. For example:

Here pí ("skin") is the inner object, and júzi ("tangerine") is introduced via the bǎ construction as the outer object.

Plurals
Chinese nouns and other parts of speech are not generally marked for number, meaning that plural forms are mostly the same as the singular. However, there is a plural marker  men, which has limited usage. It is used with personal pronouns, as in wǒmen ("we" or "us"), derived from wǒ ("I, me"). It can be used with nouns representing humans, most commonly those with two syllables, like in péngyoumen ("friends"), from péngyou ("friend"). Its use in such cases is optional. It is never used when the noun has indefinite reference, or when it is qualified by a numeral.

The demonstrative pronouns zhè ("this"), and nà ("that") may be optionally pluralized by the addition of xiē, making  zhèxiē ("these") and nàxiē ("those").

Noun phrases
The head noun of a noun phrase comes at the end of the phrase; this means that everything that modifies the noun comes before it. This includes attributive adjectives, determiners, quantifiers, possessives, and relative clauses.

Chinese does not have articles as such; a noun may stand alone to represent what in English would be expressed as "the ..." or "a[n] ...". However the word yī ("one"), followed by the appropriate classifier, may be used in some cases where English would have "a" or "an". It is also possible, with many classifiers, to omit the yī and leave the classifier on its own at the start of the noun phrase.

The demonstratives are zhè ("this"), and nà ("that"). When used before a noun, these are often followed by an appropriate classifier (for discussion of classifiers, see Classifiers below and the article Chinese classifiers). However this use of classifiers is optional. When a noun is preceded by a numeral (or a demonstrative followed by a numeral), the use of a classifier or measure word is in most cases considered mandatory. (This does not apply to nouns that function as measure words themselves; this includes many units of measurement and currency.)

The plural marker  xiē ("some, several"; also used to pluralize demonstratives) is used without a classifier. However  jǐ ("some, several, how many") takes a classifier.

For adjectives in noun phrases, see the Adjectives section. For noun phrases with pronouns rather than nouns as the head, see the Pronouns section.

Possessives are formed by adding de—the same particle that is used after relative clauses and sometimes after adjectives—after the noun, noun phrase or pronoun that denotes the possessor.

Relative clauses
Chinese relative clauses, like other noun modifiers, precede the noun they modify. Like possessives and some adjectives, they are marked with the final particle de. A free relative clause is produced if the modified noun following the de is omitted. A relative clause usually comes after any determiner phrase, such as a numeral and classifier. For emphasis, it may come before the determiner phrase.

There is usually no relative pronoun in the relative clause. Instead, a gap is left in subject or object position as appropriate. If there are two gaps—the additional gap being created by pro-dropping—ambiguity may arise. For example, chī de may mean "[those] who eat" or "[that] which is eaten". When used alone, it usually means "things to eat".

If the relative item is governed by a preposition in the relative clause, then it is denoted by a pronoun, e.g. tì tā ("for him"), to explain "for whom". Otherwise the whole prepositional phrase is omitted, the preposition then being implicitly understood.

For example sentences, see Relative clause → Mandarin.

Classifiers 

Chinese nouns require classifiers called liàngcí in order to be counted. That is, when specifying the amount of a countable noun, a classifier must be inserted which agrees with the noun. Hence one must say liǎng tóu niú ("two head of cattle") for "two cows", with tóu being the measure word or classifier. This phenomenon is common in East Asian languages. In English, some words, as in the cited example of "cattle", are often paired with a noun used much like the Chinese measure word. Bottle in "two bottles of wine" or sheet in "three sheets of paper" are further examples. However, certain nouns representing units of measurement, time, or currency are themselves classifiers. These can therefore be counted directly.

Classifiers are generally associated with certain groups of nouns related by meaning, such as tiáo for long, thin objects or animals, like ropes, snakes or fish; bǎ for objects with handles, like knives or umbrellas; or zhāng for flat, sheet-like objects like photographs, or fur. While there are dozens of classifiers, which must be memorized individually for each noun, a majority of words use the general classifier  gè. Many nouns that are associated with other classifiers can also use gè if the speaker chooses. The classifiers for many nouns appear arbitrary. The word zhuōzi ("table") is a zhāng noun, probably because a table-top is sheet-like; while yǐzi ("chair") is a bǎ noun, likely because a chair is moved by lifting something like a handle. Dèngzi, another word for chair or stool, is a gè noun.

Classifiers are also used optionally after demonstratives, and in certain other situations. See the Noun phrases section, and the article Chinese classifier.

Numerals

Pronouns

The Chinese personal pronouns are wǒ ("I, me"), nǐ ("you"), and tā ("he, him / she, her / it (animals) / it (inanimate objects)". Plurals are formed by adding men: wǒmen ("we, us"), nǐmen ("you"), tāmen ("they/them"). There is also nín, a formal, polite word for singular "you", as well as a less common plural form, nínmen. The alternative "inclusive" word for "we/us"—zán or zá[n]men, specifically including the listener (like the difference between English let us and let's)—is used colloquially. The third-person pronouns are not often used for inanimates, with demonstratives used instead.

Possessives are formed with de, such as wǒde ("my, mine"), wǒmende ("our[s]"), etc. The de may be omitted in phrases denoting inalienable possession, such as wǒ māma ("my mom").

The demonstrative pronouns are  zhè ("this", colloquially pronounced zhèi) and nà ("that", colloquially pronounced nèi). They are optionally pluralized by the addition of xiē. There is a reflexive pronoun  zìjǐ meaning "oneself, myself, etc.", which can stand alone as an object or a possessive, or may follow a personal pronoun for emphasis. The reciprocal pronoun "each other" can be translated from bǐcǐ, usually in adverb position. An alternative is hùxiāng ("mutually").

Adjectives

Adjectives can be used attributively, before a noun. The relative marker de may be added after the adjective, but this is not always required; "black horse" may be either hēi mǎ or hēi de mǎ. When multiple adjectives are used, the order "quality/size – shape – color" is followed, although this is not necessary when each adjective is made into a separate phrase with the addition of de.

Gradable adjectives can be modified by words meaning "very", etc.; such modifying adverbs normally precede the adjective, although some, such as jíle ("extremely"), come after it.

When adjectives co-occur with classifiers, they normally follow the classifier. However, with most common classifiers, when the number is "one", it is also possible to place adjectives like "big" and "small" before the classifier for emphasis.

Adjectives can also be used predicatively. In this case they behave more like verbs; there is no need for a copular verb in sentences like "he is happy" in Chinese; one may say simply tā gāoxìng ("he happy"), where the adjective may be interpreted as a verb meaning "is happy". In such sentences it is common for the adjective to be modified by a word meaning "very" or the like; in fact the word hěn ("very") is often used in such cases with gradable adjectives, even without carrying the meaning of "very".

It is nonetheless possible for a copula to be used in such sentences, to emphasize the adjective. In the phrase tā shì gāoxìng le, ("he is now truly happy"),  shì is the copula meaning "is", and le is the inceptive marker discussed later. This is similar to the cleft sentence construction. Sentences can also be formed in which an adjective followed by de stands as the complement of the copula.

Adverbs and adverbials
Adverbs and adverbial phrases normally come in a position before the verb, but after the subject of the verb. In sentences with auxiliary verbs, the adverb usually precedes the auxiliary verb as well as the main verb. Some adverbs of time and attitude ("every day", "perhaps", etc.) may be moved to the start of the clause, to modify the clause as a whole. However, some adverbs cannot be moved in this way. These include three words for "often", cháng,  chángcháng and jīngcháng; dōu ("all");  jiù  ("then"); and yòu ("again").

Adverbs of manner can be formed from adjectives using the clitic de. It is generally possible to move these adverbs to the start of the clause, although in some cases this may sound awkward, unless there is a qualifier such as hěn ("very") and a pause after the adverb.

Some verbs take a prepositional phrase following the verb and its direct object. These are generally obligatory constituents, such that the sentence would not make sense if they were omitted. For example:

There are also certain adverbial "stative complements" which follow the verb. The character dé followed by an adjective functions the same as the phrase "-ly" in English, turning the adjective into an adverb. The second is hǎo le ("complete"). It is not generally possible for a single verb to be followed by both an object and an adverbial complement of this type, although there are exceptions in cases where the complement expresses duration, frequency or goal. To express both, the verb may be repeated in a special kind of serial verb construction; the first instance taking an object, the second taking the complement. Aspect markers can then appear only on the second instance of the verb.

The typical Chinese word order "XVO", where an oblique complement such as a locative prepositional phrase precedes the verb, while a direct object comes after the verb, is very rare cross-linguistically; in fact, it is only in varieties of Chinese that this is attested as the typical ordering.

Locative phrases
Expressions of location in Chinese may include a preposition, placed before the noun; a postposition, placed after the noun; both preposition and postposition; or neither. Chinese prepositions are commonly known as coverbs – see the Coverbs section. The postpositions—which include shàng ("up, on"), xià ("down, under"), lǐ ("in, within"),  nèi ("inside") and wài ("outside")—may also be called locative particles.

In the following examples locative phrases are formed from a noun plus a locative particle:

The most common preposition of location is zài ("at, on, in"). With certain nouns that inherently denote a specific location, including nearly all place names, a locative phrase can be formed with zài together with the noun:

However other types of noun still require a locative particle as a postposition in addition to zài:

If a noun is modified so as to denote a specific location, as in "this [object]...", then it may form locative phrases without any locative particle. Some nouns which can be understood to refer to a specific place, like jiā (home) and xuéxiào ("school"), may optionally omit the locative particle. Words like shàngmiàn ("top") can function as specific-location nouns, like in zài shàngmiàn ("on top"), but can also take the role of locative particle, not necessarily with analogous meaning. The phrase zài bàozhǐ shàngmiàn, can mean either "in the newspaper" or "on the newspaper".

In certain circumstances zài can be omitted from the locative expression. Grammatically, a noun or noun phrase followed by a locative particle is still a noun phrase. For instance, zhuōzi shàng can be regarded as short for zhuōzi shàngmiàn, meaning something like "the table's top". Consequently, the locative expression without zài can be used in places where a noun phrase would be expected – for instance, as a modifier of another noun using de, or as the object of a different preposition, such as cóng ("from"). The version with zài, on the other hand, plays an adverbial role. However, zài is usually omitted when the locative expression begins a sentence with the ergative structure, where the expression, though having an adverbial function, can be seen as filling the subject or noun role in the sentence. For examples, see sentence structure section.

The word zài, like certain other prepositions or coverbs, can also be used as a verb. A locative expression can therefore appear as a predicate without the need for any additional copula. For example, "he is at school" (literally "he at school").

Comparatives and superlatives
Comparative sentences are commonly expressed simply by inserting the standard of comparison, preceded by bǐ ("than"). The adjective itself is not modified. The bǐ ("than") phrase is an adverbial, and has a fixed position before the verb. See also the section on negation.

If there is no standard of comparison—i.e., a than phrase—then the adjective can be marked as comparative by a preceding adverb bǐjiào, jiào or gèng, all meaning "more". Similarly, superlatives can be expressed using the adverb  zuì ("most"), which precedes a predicate verb or adjective.

Adverbial phrases meaning "like [someone/something]" or "as [someone/something]" can be formed using  gēn, tóng or xiàng before the noun phrase, and yīyàng or nàyàng after it.

The construction yuè ... yuè ...  can be translated into statements of the type "the more ..., the more ...".

Copula

The Chinese copular verb is shì. This is the equivalent of English "to be" and all its forms—"am", "is", "are", "was", "were", etc.  However, shì is normally only used when its complement is a noun or noun phrase. As noted above, predicate adjectives function as verbs themselves, as does the locative preposition  zài, so in sentences where the predicate is an adjectival or locative phrase, shì is not required.

For another use of shì, see shì ... [de] construction in the section on cleft sentences. The English existential phrase "there is" ["there are", etc.] is translated using the verb yǒu, which is otherwise used to denote possession.

Aspects 
Chinese does not have grammatical markers of tense. The time at which action is conceived as taking place—past, present, future—can be indicated by expressions of time—"yesterday", "now", etc.—or may simply be inferred from the context. However, Chinese does have markers of aspect, which is a feature of grammar that gives information about the temporal flow of events. There are two aspect markers that are especially commonly used with past events: the perfective-aspect le and the experiential  guo. Some authors, however, do not regard guo (or zhe; see below)  as markers of aspect. Both le and guo immediately follow the verb. There is also a sentence-final particle le, which serves a somewhat different purpose.

The perfective le presents the viewpoint of "an event in its entirety". It is sometimes considered to be a past tense marker, although it can also be used with future events, given appropriate context. Some examples of its use:

Using le shows this event that has taken place or took place at a particular time.

This format of le is usually used in a time-delimited context such as "today" or "last week".

The above may be compared with the following examples with guo, and with the examples with sentence-final le given under Particles.

The experiential guo "ascribes to a subject the property of having experienced the event".

This also implies that the speaker no longer is a soldier.

There are also two imperfective aspect markers:  zhèngzài or  zài, and  zhe, which denote ongoing actions or states. Zhèngzài and zài precede the verb, and are usually used for ongoing actions or dynamic events – they may be translated as "[be] in the process of [-ing]" or "[be] in the middle of [-ing]". Zhe follows the verb, and is used mostly for static situations.

Both markers may occur in the same clause, however. For example, tā zhèngzai dǎ [zhe] diànhuà, "he is in the middle of telephoning someone".

The delimitative aspect denotes an action that goes on only for some time, "doing something 'a little bit'". This can be expressed by reduplication of a monosyllabic verb, like the verb  zǒu ( "walk") in the following sentence:

An alternative construction is reduplication with insertion of "one" ( yī). For example,  zǒu yi zǒu, which might be translated as "walk a little walk". A further possibility is reduplication followed by kàn ( "to see"); this emphasizes the "testing" nature of the action. If the verb has an object, kàn follows the object.

Some compound verbs, such as restrictive-resultative and coordinate compounds, can also be reduplicated on the pattern tǎolùn-tǎolùn, from the verb  tǎolùn, meaning "discuss". Other compounds may be reduplicated, but for general emphasis rather than delimitative aspect. In compounds that are verb–object combinations, like tiào wǔ ("dance"), a delimitative aspect can be marked by reduplicating the first syllable, creating tiào-tiào wǔ, which may be followed with kàn.

Passive
As mentioned above, the fact that a verb is intended to be understood in the passive voice is not always marked in Chinese. However, it may be marked using the passive marker 被 bèi, followed by the agent, though bèi may appear alone, if the agent is not to be specified. Certain causative markers can replace bèi, such as those mentioned in the Other cases section,  gěi, jiào and ràng. Of these causative markers, only gěi can appear alone without a specified agent. The construction with a passive marker is normally used only when there is a sense of misfortune or adversity. The passive marker and agent occupy the typical adverbial position before the verb. See the Negation section for more. Some examples:

Negation
The most commonly used negating element is bù, pronounced with second tone when followed by a fourth tone. This can be placed before a verb, preposition or adverb to negate it. For example: "I don't eat chicken". For the double-verb negative construction with bù, see Complement of result, below. However, the verb yǒu—which can mean either possession, or "there is/are" in existential clauses—is negated using méi to produce méiyǒu.

For negation of a verb intended to denote a completed event, méi or méiyǒu is used instead of bù, and the aspect marker le is then omitted. Also, méi[yǒu] is used to negate verbs that take the aspect marker guo; in this case the aspect marker is not omitted.

In coverb constructions, the negator may come before the coverb (preposition) or before the full verb, the latter being more emphatic. In constructions with a passive marker, the negator precedes that marker; similarly, in comparative constructions, the negator precedes the bǐ phraseNot clear (unless the verb is further qualified by gèng ("even more"), in which case the negator may follow the gèng to produce the meaning "even less").

The negator bié precedes the verb in negative commands and negative requests, such as in phrases meaning "don't ...", "please don't ...".

The negator wèi means "not yet". Other items used as negating elements in certain compound words include wú,wù, miǎn and fēi.

A double negative makes a positive, as in sentences like wǒ bú shì bù xǐhuān tā ("It's not that I don't like her" ). For this use of shì, see the Cleft sentences section.

Questions
In wh-questions in Chinese, the question word is not fronted. Instead, it stays in the position in the sentence that would be occupied by the item being asked about. For example, "What did you say?" is phrased as nǐ shuō shé[n]me (literally "you say what"). The word shénme ("what" or "which"), remains in the object position after the verb.

Other interrogative words include:
"Who": shuí/shéi
"What": shénme; shá (used informally)
"Where": nǎr; nǎlǐ
"When": shénme shíhòu;  héshí
"Which": nǎ
When used to mean "which ones", nǎ is used with a classifier and noun, or with xiē and noun. The noun may be omitted if understood through context.
"Why": wèishé[n]me; gànmá
"How many": duōshǎo
When the number is quite small, jǐ is used, followed by a classifier.
"How": zěnme[yang]; rúhé.

Disjunctive questions can be made using the word háishì between the options, like English "or". This differs from the word for "or" in statements, which is huòzhě.

Yes-no questions can be formed using the sentence-final particle  ma, with word order otherwise the same as in a statement. For example, nǐ chī jī ma? ("Do you eat chicken?").

An alternative is the A-not-A construction, using phrases like chī bu chī ("eat or not eat"). With two-syllable verbs, sometimes only the first syllable is repeated: xǐ-bu-xǐhuān ("like or not like"), from  xǐhuān ("like"). It is also possible to use the A-not-A construction with prepositions (coverbs) and phrases headed by them, as with full verbs.

The negator méi can be used rather than bù in the A-not-A construction when referring to a completed event, but if it occurs at the end of the sentence—i.e. the repetition is omitted—the full form méiyǒu must appear.

For answering yes-no questions, Chinese has words that may be used like the English "yes" and "no" – duì or shì de for "yes"; bù for "no" – but these are not often used for this purpose; it is more common to repeat the verb or verb phrase (or entire sentence), negating it if applicable.

Imperatives
Second-person imperative sentences are formed in the same way as statements, and like in English, the subject "you" is often omitted.

Orders may be softened by preceding them with an element such as qǐng ("to ask"), in this use equivalent to English "please". See Particles for more. The sentence-final particle ba can be used to form first-person imperatives, equivalent to "let's...".

Serial verb constructions 
Chinese makes frequent use of serial verb constructions, or verb stacking, where two or more verbs or verb phrases are concatenated together. This frequently involves either verbal complements appearing after the main verb, or coverb phrases appearing before the main verb, but other variations of the construction occur as well.

Auxiliaries 
A main verb may be preceded by an auxiliary verb, as in English. The auxiliary normally follows an adverb, if present. In shortened sentences an auxiliary may be used without a main verb, analogously to English sentences such as "I can."

Verbal complements 
The active verb of a sentence may be suffixed with a second verb, which usually indicates either the result of the first action, or the direction in which it took the subject. When such information is applicable, it is generally considered mandatory. The phenomenon is sometimes called double verbs.

Complement of result 
A complement of result, or resultative complement is a verbal suffix which indicates the outcome, or possible outcome, of the action indicated by the main verb. In the following examples, the main verb is tīng ( "to listen"), and the complement of result is dǒng ("to understand/to know").

Since they indicate an absolute result, such double verbs necessarily represent a completed action, and are thus negated using méi:

The infix de is placed between the double verbs to indicate possibility or ability. This is not possible with "restrictive" resultative compounds such as jiéshěng (literally "reduce-save", meaning "to save, economize").

This is equivalent in meaning to  néng tīng dǒng, using the auxiliary néng, equivalent to "may" or "can".

To negate the above construction, de is replaced by bù:

With some verbs, the addition of bù and a particular complement of result is the standard method of negation. In many cases the complement is liǎo, represented by the same character as the perfective or modal particle le. This verb means "to finish", but when used as a complement for negation purposes it may merely indicate inability. For example:  shòu bù liǎo ("to be unable to tolerate").

The complement of result is a highly productive and frequently used construction. Sometimes it develops into idiomatic phrases, as in è sǐ le (literally "hungry-until-die already",  meaning "to be starving") and qì sǐ le (literally "mad-until-die already", meaning "to be extremely angry"). The phrases for "hatred", "excuse me", and "too expensive to buy" all use the character qǐ ("to rise up") as a complement of result, but their meanings are not obviously related to that meaning. This is partially the result of metaphorical construction, where kànbùqǐ literally means "to be unable to look up to"; and duìbùqǐ means "to be unable to face someone".

Some more examples of resultative complements, used in complete sentences:

Double-verb construction where the second verb, "break", is a suffix to the first, and indicates what happens to the object as a result of the action.

Another double-verb where the second verb, "understand", suffixes the first and clarifies the possibility and success of the relevant action.

Complement of direction 
A complement of direction, or directional complement indicates the direction of an action involving movement.  The simplest directional complements are  qù ("to go") and lái ("to come"), which may be added after a verb to indicate movement away from or towards the speaker, respectively.  These may form compounds with other verbs that further specify the direction, such as shàng qù ("to go up"), gùo lái ("to come over"), which may then be added to another verb, such as zǒu ("to walk"), as in zǒu gùo qù ("to walk over"). Another example, in a whole sentence:

 The directional suffixes indicate "up" and "towards".

If the preceding verb has an object, the object may be placed either before or after the directional complement(s), or even between two directional complements, provided the second of these is not qù.

The structure with inserted de or bù is not normally used with this type of double verb. There are exceptions, such as "to be unable to get out of bed" ( or ).

Coverbs 
Chinese has a class of words, called coverbs, which in some respects resemble both verbs and prepositions. They appear with a following object (or complement), and generally denote relationships that would be expressed by prepositions (or postpositions) in other languages. However, they are often considered to be lexically verbs, and some of them can also function as full verbs. When a coverb phrase appears in a sentence together with a main verb phrase, the result is essentially a type of serial verb construction. The coverb phrase, being an adverbial, precedes the main verb in most cases.  For instance:

Here the main verb is zhǎo ("find"), and bāng is a coverb. Here bāng corresponds to the English preposition "for", even though in other contexts it might be used as a full verb meaning "help".

Here there are three coverbs: zuò ( "by"), cóng ("from"), and dào ("to"). The words zuò and dào can also be verbs, meaning "sit" and "arrive [at]" respectively. However, cóng is not normally used as a full verb.

A very common coverb that can also be used as a main verb is zài, as described in the Locative phrases section. Another example is gěi, which as a verb means "give". As a preposition, gěi may mean "for", or "to" when marking an indirect object or in certain other expressions.

Because coverbs essentially function as prepositions, they can also be referred to simply as prepositions. In Chinese they are called jiè cí, a term which generally corresponds to "preposition", or more generally, "adposition". The situation is complicated somewhat by the fact that location markers—which also have meanings similar to those of certain English prepositions—are often called "postpositions".

Coverbs normally cannot take aspect markers, although some of them form fixed compounds together with such markers, such as  gēnzhe, ànzhe ("according to"), yánzhe ("along"), and wèile ( "for").

Other cases
Serial verb constructions can also consist of two consecutive verb phrases with parallel meaning, such as hē kāfēi kàn bào, "drink coffee and read the paper". Each verb may independently be negated or given the le aspect marker. If both verbs would have the same object, it is omitted the second time.

Consecutive verb phrases may also be used to indicate consecutive events. Use of the le aspect marker with the first verb may imply that this is the main verb of the sentence, the second verb phrase merely indicating the purpose. Use of this le with the second verb changes this emphasis, and may require a sentence-final le particle in addition. On the other hand, the progressive aspect marker zài may be applied to the first verb, but not normally the second alone. The word qù ("go") or  lái ("come") may be inserted between the two verb phrases, meaning "in order to".

For constructions with consecutive verb phrases containing the same verb, see under Adverbs. For immediate repetition of a verb, see Reduplication and Aspects.

Another case is the causative or pivotal construction. Here the object of one verb also serves as the subject of the following verb. The first verb may be something like  gěi ("allow", or "give" in other contexts), ràng ("let"), jiào ("order" or "call") or shǐ ("make, compel"), qǐng ("invite"), or lìng ("command"). Some of these cannot take an aspect marker such as le when used in this construction, like lìng, ràng, shǐ. Sentences of this type often parallel the equivalent English pattern, except that English may insert the infinitive marker "to". In the following example the construction is used twice:

Particles 

Chinese has a number of sentence-final particles – these are weak syllables, spoken with neutral tone, and placed at the end of the sentence to which they refer. They are often called modal particles or yǔqì zhùcí, as they serve chiefly to express grammatical mood, or how the sentence relates to reality and/or intent. They include:

 ma, which changes a statement into a yes-no question
 ne, which expresses surprise, or produces a question "with expectation"
 ba, which serves as a tag question, e.g. "don't you think so?"; produces a suggestion e.g. "let's..."; or lessens certainty of a decision.
It can also be used to add positive connotation to certain phrases or inject uncertainty when responding to a question.
 ou, which signals a friendly warning
 zhe, which marks the inchoative aspect, or need for change of state, in imperative sentences. Compare the imperfective aspect marker zhe in the section above) 
 le, which marks a "currently relevant state".

This sentence-final le should be distinguished from the verb suffix le discussed in the Aspects section. Whereas the sentence-final particle is sometimes described as an inceptive or as a marker of perfect aspect, the verb suffix is described as a marker of perfective aspect. Some examples of its use:

The position of le in this example emphasizes his present status as a soldier, rather than the event of becoming. Compare with the post-verbal le example given in the Aspects section, wǒ dāng le bīng.

Compared with the post-verbal le and guo examples, this places the focus on the number three, and does not specify whether he is going to continue watching more games.

The two uses of le may in fact be traced back to two entirely different words. The fact that they are now written the same way in Mandarin can cause ambiguity, particularly when the verb is not followed by an object. Consider the following sentence:

This le might be interpreted as either the suffixal perfective marker or the sentence-final perfect marker. In the former case it might mean "mother has come", as in she has just arrived at the door, while in the latter it might mean "mother is coming!", and the speaker wants to inform others of this fact. It is even possible for the two kinds of le to co-occur:

Without the first le, the sentence could again mean "he has eaten", or it could mean "he wants to eat now". Without the final le the sentence would be ungrammatical without appropriate context, as perfective le cannot appear in a semantically unbounded sentence.

Cleft sentences
There is a construction in Chinese known as the shì ... [de] construction, which produces what may be called cleft sentences. The copula  shì is placed before the element of the sentence which is to be emphasized, and the optional possessive particle de is placed at the end of the sentence if the sentence ends in a verb, or after the last verb of the sentence if the sentence ends with a complement of the verb. For example:

Example with a sentence that ends with a complement:

If an object following the verb, is to be emphasized in this construction, the shì precedes the object, and the de comes after the verb and before the shì.

Sentences with similar meaning can be produced using relative clauses. These may be called pseudo-cleft sentences.

Conjunctions
Chinese has various conjunctions such as hé ("and"), dànshì ("but"), huòzhě ("or"), etc. However Chinese quite often uses no conjunction where English would have "and".

Two or more nouns may be joined together by the conjunctions hé ("and") or huò ( "or"); for example dāo hé chā ("knife and fork"), gǒu huò māo ("dog or cat").

Certain adverbs are often used as correlative conjunctions, where correlating words appear in each of the linked clauses, such as búdàn ... érqiě, suīrán ... háishì, yīnwèi ... suǒyǐ. Such connectors may appear at the start of a clause or before the verb phrase.

Similarly, words like jìrán ("since/in response to"), rúguǒ or jiǎrú "if", zhǐyào ( "provided that") correlate with an adverb jiù ("then") or yě ("also") in the main clause, to form conditional sentences.

In some cases, the same word may be repeated when connecting items; these include yòu ... yòu ... ("both ... and ..."),  yībiān ... yībiān ... ("... while ..."), and yuè ... yuè ... ("the more ..., the more ...").

Conjunctions of time such as "when" may be translated with a construction that corresponds to something like "at the time (+relative clause)", where as usual, the Chinese relative clause comes before the noun ("time" in this case). For example:

Variants include dāng ... yǐqián ( "before ...") and dāng ... yǐhòu ("after ..."), which do not use the relative marker de. In all of these cases, the initial dāng may be replaced by zài, or may be omitted. There are also similar constructions for conditionals: rúguǒ /jiǎrú/zhǐyào ... dehuà ("if ... then"), where huà literally means "narrative, story".

See also 
Classical Chinese grammar
Cantonese grammar

Notes

References

Bibliography

Further reading

External links

 A Summary of Chinese Grammar

 
Sino-Tibetan grammars